Jean‐Marie Ngendahayo (born 1956) is a Burundian politician.

Early life and education 
Jean‐Marie Ngendahayo was born in 1956 in Cibitoke Province, Ruanda-Urundi. Ethnically, he is Ganwa, though this category has been subsumed into the Tutsi ethnic group. He attended primary school from 1961 to 1969 and thereafter attended the Holy Spirit Lycée until 1976. That year he enrolled at the University of Burundi, and he graduated from the institution in 1981 with a degree in Roman philology. He later married, having two daughters from his first marriage and a son from his second marriage.

Ngendahayo initially worked as a teacher, but eventually took up a position with the European Economic Community. He then worked for the United Nations Children's Fund's Burundi office and the United Nations Population Fund.

Political career 
In the early 1990s Burundi underwent a democratic transition and returned to multi-party politics. In February 1991 Ngendahayo became one of the twelve founding members of the Iteka League, a human rights association. He joined Melchior Ndadaye's political party, the Front for Democracy in Burundi (FRODEBU). In Burundi's legislative elections held in June 1993, Ngendahayo was elected to a seat in the National Assembly representing Cibitoke. He became Minister of Communications in Prime Minister Sylvie Kinigi's government on 10 July. In this capacity he suspended a newspaper's publication for attacking the president, but the Commission on Press Freedom overturned his decision.

Later in 1993 Ngendahayo was appointed Minister of Foreign Affairs. In June 1995 he and United States Ambassador Bob Krueger were ambushed by rebels while traveling in a convoy in the countryside. The two escaped and were flown by helicopter back to the capital. He resigned from his post on 25 June and fled to Johannesburg, South Africa, saying that the government was unable to provide for the safety of Burundian citizens. He came back to Burundi in 2002.

In the 2005 Burundian legislative election Ngendahayo won a seat in the National Assembly on a National Council for the Defense of Democracy – Forces for the Defense of Democracy (CNDD-FDD) ticket. He subsequently rose to become chairman of the Parliamentary Committee on Foreign Affairs. In May he was appointed Minister of Interior. In September 2007 he left the CNDD-FDD, citing his unhappiness with the government's actions, particularly concerning human rights.

Later life 
In 2008 Ngendahayo went into exile in the United States. He returned to Burundi two years later and began writing and teaching.

References

Works cited 
 
 
 

1956 births
People from Cibitoke Province
Ganwa people
Foreign ministers of Burundi
Living people
Front for Democracy in Burundi politicians
National Council for the Defense of Democracy – Forces for the Defense of Democracy politicians
University of Burundi alumni